Whittle-le-Woods is a civil parish in the Borough of Chorley, Lancashire, England.  The parish contains 35 buildings that are recorded in the National Heritage List for England as designated listed buildings. Of these, one is listed at Grade II*, the middle grade, and the others are at Grade II, the lowest grade.  The parish, which was formerly mainly rural, contains the village of Whittle-le-Woods, and agricultural land has been used for residential development in and around the village.  Many of the listed buildings are, or originated as, farmhouses and farm buildings, some of which contain former loomshops that were used for the weaving industry.  There are two former country houses and associated structures that are listed and which have been converted for other uses.  The Leeds and Liverpool Canal passes through the parish, as does the abandoned southern section of the Lancaster Canal;  there are a number of listed structures associated with both of these.  Also in the parish, and listed, are two churches and associated structures, smaller houses and cottages, a row of almshouses, a bridge over the River Lostock, a gun emplacement, and a public house.

Key

Buildings

References

Citations

Sources

Lists of listed buildings in Lancashire
Buildings and structures in the Borough of Chorley